Šentjurje ( or) is a small settlement to the east of Šentvid pri Stični in the Municipality of Ivančna Gorica in central Slovenia. The area is part of the historical region of Lower Carniola. The municipality is now included in the Central Slovenia Statistical Region. 

The local church from which the settlement gets its name is dedicated to Saint George ( or colloquially Šentjur) and belongs to the Parish of Veliki Gaber. It dates to the early 16th century.

References

External links
Šentjurje on Geopedia

Populated places in the Municipality of Ivančna Gorica